Ali Sadeghi is an Iranian actor. His first work was in the series My Best Summer with a humorous look at the Iran-Iraq war.

Filmography

Movies

series

References

External links

 

Iranian male actors
Living people
Iranian male stage actors
Iranian male television actors
1980 births